Ulm is a city in Germany.

Ulm may also refer to:

Free Imperial City of Ulm (1181–1803), a State of the Holy Roman Empire
Battle of Ulm, a battle which took place there in 1805 during the Napoleonic wars
University of Ulm
Ulm School of Design, an influential school that existed from 1953 to 1968
Ulm, a village in Cerbăl Commune, Hunedoara County, Romania
Ulm, Arkansas, United States
Ulm, Montana, United States
Charles Ulm (1898–1934), pioneer Australian aviator
Stefan Ulm (born 1975), five-time world champion and two-time Olympic silver medalist in sprint canoeing
David Ulm (born 1984), French football player
 the nickname of the École Normale Supérieure college in Paris, located on the rue d'Ulm

ULM may stand for:

 University of Louisiana at Monroe
 The school's athletic program, the ULM Warhawks or Louisiana–Monroe Warhawks
 Universitas Lambung Mangkurat, Indonesian public university located in South Kalimantan, Indonesia
IATA and FAA codes for New Ulm Municipal Airport
In ultralight aviation, ultralight/microlight aircraft
Unión LatinoAmericana de Motociclismo
Uzboi-Landon-Morava, an outflow basin on Mars

See also
New Ulm (disambiguation)